Wiedigsburghalle in a multi-purpose indoor arena in Nordhausen, Thuringia, Germany. Its best known tenant is the women's handball club Thüringer HC, one of the top teams of the German championship, that also regularly plays in the EHF Champions League.

References

Nordhausen, Thuringia
Indoor arenas in Germany
Handball venues in Germany
Buildings and structures in Thuringia